Arved is a masculine given name. Notable people with the given name include:

Arved Birnbaum (b. 1962), German actor
Arved Crüger (1911–1942), German WWII Luftwaffe wing commander
Arved Deringer (1913–2011), German lawyer and politician
Arved Fuchs (born 1953), German polar explorer and writer
Arved Heinrichsen (also known as Arvydas Hainričsenas; 1879–1900), German-Lithuanian chess master
Arved Ruusa (1900–1992), Estonian politician and lawyer
Arved von Schultz (1883–1967), German photographer
Arved Toots (1930–1992), Estonian agronomist and breeder of Tori horses
Arved Viirlaid (1922–2015), Estonian-Canadian writer

See also
Arvéd, a 2022 Czech film

German masculine given names
Estonian masculine given names